Julian Suri (born April 6, 1991) is an American professional golfer who currently plays on the European Tour.

Amateur career
Suri played college golf at Duke University where he won three events and was an All-American in 2012.

Professional career
Suri turned professional in 2013. 

In 2016 he played all three stages of the European Tour Qualifying School.  He finished just one stroke away from qualifying for the European Tour, to earn a place on the Challenge Tour.

In May 2017 he was runner-up in the Open de Portugal and two weeks later earned his first professional win at the D+D Real Czech Challenge on the Challenge Tour. Suri qualified for the 2017 Open Championship, his first major championship, through Final Qualifying. In August 2017 Suri had his first European Tour win, the Made in Denmark tournament. Despite only playing a partial season on the European Tour, Suri performed well enough to qualify for the DP World Tour Championship, where he finished tied for 8th, and he ended the season 52nd in the Road to Dubai.

Personal
Suri is of Indian and Mexican descent.

Amateur wins
2011 Rod Myers Invitational
2012 John Burns Intercollegiate, Rod Myers Invitational

Source:

Professional wins (2)

European Tour wins (1)

Challenge Tour wins (1)

Results in major championships

CUT = missed the half-way cut
"T" = tied

Results in World Golf Championships

"T" = Tied

References

External links

American male golfers
Duke Blue Devils men's golfers
European Tour golfers
Golfers from New York (state)
Golfers from Florida
Sportspeople from New York City
People from St. Augustine, Florida
1991 births
Living people